Anscombe's quartet comprises four data sets that have nearly identical simple descriptive statistics, yet have very different distributions and appear very different when graphed. Each dataset consists of eleven (x,y) points. They were constructed in 1973 by the statistician Francis Anscombe to demonstrate both the importance of graphing data when analyzing it, and the effect of outliers and other influential observations on statistical properties. He described the article as being intended to counter the impression among statisticians that "numerical calculations are exact, but graphs are rough."

Data

For all four datasets:

* The first scatter plot (top left) appears to be a simple linear relationship, corresponding to two variables correlated where y could be modelled as gaussian with mean linearly dependent on x. 
 The second graph (top right); while a relationship between the two variables is obvious, it is not linear, and the Pearson correlation coefficient is not relevant. A more general regression and the corresponding coefficient of determination would be more appropriate. 
 In the third graph (bottom left), the modelled relationship is linear, but should have a different regression line (a robust regression would have been called for). The calculated regression is offset by the one outlier which exerts enough influence to lower the correlation coefficient from 1 to 0.816. 
 Finally, the fourth graph (bottom right) shows an example when one high-leverage point is enough to produce a high correlation coefficient, even though the other data points do not indicate any relationship between the variables.

The quartet is still often used to illustrate the importance of looking at a set of data graphically before starting to analyze according to a particular type of relationship, and the inadequacy of basic statistic properties for describing realistic datasets.

The datasets are as follows. The x values are the same for the first three datasets.

It is not known how Anscombe created his datasets. Since its publication, several methods to generate similar data sets with identical statistics and dissimilar graphics have been developed.
One of these, the Datasaurus Dozen, consists of points tracing out the outline of a dinosaur, plus twelve other data sets that have the same summary statistics. Datasaurus Dozen was created by Justin Matejka and George Fitzmaurice. The process is described in their paper “Same stats, different graphs: generating datasets with varied appearance and identical statistics through simulated annealing“. 

The Datasaurus Dozen, just like Anscombe's Quartet, shows why visualizing data is important, as the summary statistics can be the same, while the data distributions can be very different.

See also
Exploratory data analysis
Goodness of fit
Regression validation
Simpson's paradox
Statistical model validation

References

External links
Department of Physics, University of Toronto
Dynamic Applet made in GeoGebra showing the data & statistics and also allowing the points to be dragged (Set 5).
Animated examples from Autodesk called the "Datasaurus Dozen".
Documentation for the datasets in R.

Misuse of statistics
Statistical charts and diagrams
Statistical data sets
1973 introductions
1973 in science